Avraham Sinai (born December 15th 1962) is a former Hezbollah member who spied for Israel. Originally named Ibrahim Yassin, he fled from Lebanon to Israel in 1997 and later converted from Shia Islam to Judaism.

Biography
In 1997 Sinai fled Lebanon, settling in Safed with his wife and seven children. After attending synagogue services on Yom Kippur in 2000, he decided to become a Jew. After years of study, he was converted by Rabbi Shmuel Eliyahu, chief rabbi of Safed. 

Sinai is the author of A Martyr from Lebanon: Life in the Shadow of Danger, which describes some of his experiences.

References

1962 births
Living people
Lebanese Jews
Converts to Judaism from Shia Islam
Lebanese former Shia Muslims
Israeli former Muslims
Israeli Arab Jews
Israeli spies
Lebanese emigrants to Israel
Israeli people of Lebanese descent
People from Safed
Arab supporters of Israel
Arab citizens of Israel